Wing Commander Robert Carl 'Moose' Fumerton  (21 March 191310 July 2006) was the top scoring Canadian night-fighter flying ace during World War II.

Biography
Fumerton was born in Fort-Coulonge, Quebec, and attended Shawville High School (now Pontiac High School) in Shawville, Quebec. Initially employed as a timber worker, he contracted diphtheria. He then spent seven years in the North-West Territories and the Yukon surveying, mapping, and gold prospecting.

Service career
In 1938 he obtained a pilot's licence and when war broke out he volunteered to be a pilot with the Royal Canadian Air Force (RCAF). Fumerton graduated as a pilot in July 1940 and arrived in England in August 1940 with No. 112 Squadron, flying the Westland Lysander. Fighter Command was so short of fighter pilots that he joined No. 32 Squadron RAF, flying Hurricanes.

After the battle ended Fumerton moved to No. 1 Squadron. In June 1941 he transferred to night fighting duties and joined the newly formed No 406 (RCAF) Squadron, based in Northumberland.

He then joined No. 89 Squadron in October 1941, flying night operations over Egypt and later Malta in June 1942. With his observer Sgt. Pat Bing, Fumerton became the island's top-scoring night fighter pilot, claiming nine victories by the end of August 1941.

His first success over Malta came on the night of 24 June, an Italian bomber, before returning to refuel and rearm. Just before dawn he destroyed another bomber. Four nights later he accounted for two Junkers Ju 88s. On July 1 he downed a Ju 88, and the following night he shot down another near Gozo. On July 28 he shot down another Ju 88.

On the night of 10 August, when taking off to attack a force of incoming bombers both his engines failed. He and Bing were forced to bail out over the sea, spending several hours in their dinghies before being rescued next morning by an air-sea rescue launch.

He spent the first six months of 1943 in Canada, before returning to No. 406 Squadron RAF in August 1943. He returned, tour-expired, to Canada on 11 August 1944.

Tally and awards
Fumerton shot down 14 enemy aircraft, the highest tally among RCAF night fighter aces, being awarded the Distinguished Flying Cross and Bar.  He was also awarded an Air Force Cross for service as Commanding Officer of No. 7 OTU (Operational Training Unit) at Debert, Nova Scotia.

Later career
He retired from the RCAF in 1946, and Fumerton returned to mining. In 1948 he went to Hangkow to train Chinese pilots and organise the formation of squadrons for General Chiang Kai-shek's Chinese Nationalist Air Force. He returned to Canada a year later and became an estate agent.

References

Royal Canadian Air Force officers
Canadian World War II flying aces
1913 births
2006 deaths
Recipients of the Air Force Cross (United Kingdom)